Hyperbaton , in its original meaning, is a figure of speech in which a phrase is made discontinuous by the insertion of other words. In modern usage, the term is also used more generally for figures of speech that transpose sentences' natural word order, and it is also called an anastrophe.

Etymology
The word is borrowed from the Greek hyperbaton, meaning "stepping over", which is derived from hyper ("over") and bainein ("to step"), with the -tos verbal adjective suffix. The idea is that to understand the phrase, the reader has to "step over" the words inserted in between.

Classical usage
The separation of connected words for emphasis or effect is possible to a much greater degree in highly-inflected languages, whose sentence meaning does not depend closely on word order. In Latin and Ancient Greek, the effect of hyperbaton is often to emphasize the first word. It has been called "perhaps the most distinctively alien feature of Latin word order." Donatus, in his work On tropes, includes under hyperbaton five varieties: hysterologia, anastrophe (for which the term hyperbaton is sometimes used loosely as a synonym), parenthesis, tmesis, and synchysis.

Ancient Greek
 (Demosthenes 18.158) 
"Greece has suffered such things at the hands of only one person"

In the above example, the word "(only) one", henos, occurs in its normal place after the preposition "at the hands of" (hupo), but "person" (anthrōpou) is unnaturally delayed, giving emphasis to "only one."

 (occurs several times in Euripides)
"[I entreat] you by your knees"

Here the word "you" (se) divides the preposition "by" from its object "knees."

 (Plato, Republic 358b)
"What power does it have?"

New Testament Greek
Hyperbaton is also common in New Testament Greek, for example:

In all these examples and others in the New Testament, the first word of the hyperbaton is an adjective or adverb which is emphasised by being separated from the following noun. The separating word can be a verb, noun, or pronoun.

Latin

Prose
In Latin hyperbaton is frequently found in both prose and verse. The following examples come from prose writers. Often, there is an implied contrast between the first word of the hyperbaton and its opposite:
meo tu epistulam dedisti servo? (Plautus, Pseudolus 1203) 
"You gave the letter to my slave (i.e. not your own)?"
duas a te accepi epistulas heri (Cicero, Att., 14.2.1) 
"I received two letters (duas epistulas) from you yesterday" (not just one).
hae permanserunt aquae dies complures. (Caesar, B.C. 1.50.1):
"This time the flood (hae aquae) lasted (permanserunt) several days" (unlike the earlier one).
ille sic dies (Cicero, Att. 5.1.3) 
"So (passed) that day (ille dies)" (as opposed to the following one).

Sometimes the hyperbaton merely emphasises the adjective:
pro ingenti itaque victoria id fuit plebi. (Livy 4.54.6)
"The people saw this, therefore, as an enormous victory."
magnam enim secum pecuniam portabat (Nepos, Hannibal, 9.2)
"for (enim) he was carrying a large sum of money (magnam pecuniam) with him (secum)".
magno cum fremitu et clamore (Cicero, to Atticus, 2.19.2)
"with (cum) a great deal of roaring and shouting"

The first word of the hyperbaton can also be an adverb, as in the following example:
aeque vita iucunda (Cicero, de Finibus 4.30) 
"a life (vita) equally pleasant (aeque iucunda).

In all the above examples, the first word of the hyperbaton can be said to be emphasised. The following is different, since there is no emphasis on sum "I am". Instead, the effect of emphasis is achieved by reversing the expected order ipse sum mensus to sum ipse mensus: 
sum enim ipse mensus (Cicero, ad Quintum fratrem, 3.1.4)
"for I measured (sum mensus) it myself"

It is also possible for the noun to come first ("postmodifier hyperbaton"), as in the following:
dies appetebat septimus (Caesar, B.G. 6.35.1)
"The seventh day was approaching"

Antonius legiones eduxit duas. (Cicero, ad Fam. 10.30.1)
"Antonius led out two legions."

The following even have a double hyperbaton:
cum ipse litteram Socrates nullam reliquisset. (Cicero, de Orat. 3.60)
"When Socrates himself didn't leave a single line of writing."

praeda potitus ingenti est (Livy 40.49.1)
"he took possession of an enormous amount of booty".

A hyperbaton can also be used to demonstrate a kind of picture shown in the text:
 Hac in utramque partem disputatione habita" (Caesar, Bello Gallico 5.30)
"With the dispute being held unto either side" (showing an elegance to the dispute being on either side of the accusative prepositional phrase)Another kind of hyperbaton is "genitive hyperbaton" in which one of the words is in the genitive case:
contionem advocat militum (Caesar, Bellum Civile 2.32)
"He called a meeting of the soldiers."

In the following, a genitive hyperbaton and an adjectival hyperbaton are interleaved:
magnus omnium incessit timor animis (Caesar Bellum Civile 2.29)
"Great fear (magnus timor) overcame the minds of all of them (omnium animis)."

Another kind of hyperbaton (called "conjunct hyperbaton" by Devine and Stephens) is found when a phrase consisting of two words joined by et ("and") is separated by another word:
Aspendus, vetus oppidum et nobile (Cicero, Verr. 2.1.53) 
"Aspendus, an old town, and a noble one".

Faesulas inter Arretiumque (Livy, 22.3.3)
"Between Faesulae and Arretium".

Poetry
In poetry, especially poetry from the 1st century BC onwards, hyperbaton is very common; some 40% of Horace's adjectives are separated from their nouns. 

Frequently two hyperbata are used in the same sentence, as in the following example:
quam Catullus unam/ plus quam se atque suos amavit omnes (Catullus 58a) 
"whom alone (quam unam) Catullus loved (amavit) more than himself and all his own (suos omnes)."

Often two noun phrases are interleaved in a double hyperbaton:
saevae memorem Iunonis ob iram (Virgil, Aeneid, 1.5)
"on account of the mindful anger (memorem iram) of cruel Juno (saevae Iunonis)".
lurida terribiles miscent aconita novercae (Ovid, Metamorphoses, 1.147)
"Fearsome stepmothers (terribiles novercae) mix lurid aconites (lurida aconita)."

The above type, where two adjectives are followed by a verb and then two nouns in the same order as the adjectives, is often referred to as a "golden line".

In the following line, a conjunct hyperbaton is interleaved with another noun phrase:
venator cursu canis et latratibus instat.
"the hunting dog (venator canis) threatens him with running and barking (cursu et latratibus)."

In other cases one hyperbaton is inserted inside another:
in nova fert animus mutatas dicere formas / corpora (Ovid, Metamorphoses 1.1)
"My spirit leads me to tell of forms transformed (mutatas formas) into new bodies (nova corpora)."
ab Hyrcanis Indoque a litore silvis (Lucan 8.343)
"from the Hyrcanian forests (Hyrcanis silvis) and from the Indian shore (Indo litore)."

In such cases, the placing of two adjectives together may highlight a contrast between them, for example, in the following sentence from Horace, where the fragility of the boat is contrasted with the roughness of the sea:
qui fragilem truci commisit pelago ratem (Horace, Odes, 1.3.10f) 
"who committed a fragile boat (fragilem ratem) to the rough sea (truci pelago)"

Similarly in the example from Ovid below "transparent" is contrasted with "dense":
et liquidum spisso secrevit ab aere caelum (Ovid, Metamorphoses 1.23)
"and He separated the transparent heaven (liquidum caelum) from the dense atmosphere (spisso aere)."

Usually the adjective in a discontinuous noun phrase comes first, as in the above examples, but the opposite is also possible: 
cristāque tegit galea aurea rubrā (Virgil, Aeneid 9.50)
"And a golden helmet with a red crest (crista rubra) covers him."
silva lupus in Sabina (Horace, Odes, 1.22) 
"a wolf (lupus) (lurking) in the Sabine forest (silva Sabina)."

The above example illustrates another occasional feature of hyperbaton, since the word "wolf" (lupus) is actually inside the phrase "Sabine forest" (silva Sabina). This kind of word-play is found elsewhere in Horace also, e.g. grato, Pyrrha, sub antro "Pyrrha, beneath a pleasant grotto", where Pyrrha is indeed in a grotto; and in the quotation from Horace Odes 1.5 below, the girl is surrounded by the graceful boy, who in turn is surrounded by a profusion of roses:
quis multa gracilis te puer in rosa (Horace, Odes, 1.5)
"what graceful boy (gracilis puer) (is embracing) you (te) amidst many a rose (multa rosa)?"

Other languages
The classical type of hyperbaton is also found in Slavic languages like Polish:

Certain conditions are necessary for hyperbaton to be possible in Polish: discontinuous noun phrases typically contain just one modifier, and the noun and modifier must be separated by a verb (and not, for example, by the indirect object Markowi alone).

Similar constructions are found in other languages, such as Russian, Latvian, and Modern Greek from which the following example comes:

Ntelitheos (2004) points out that one condition enabling such constructions is that the adjective is in contrastive focus ("the red dress, not the blue one").

English usage

In English studies, the term "hyperbaton" is defined differently, as "a figure of speech in which the normal order of words is reversed, as in cheese I love" (Collins English Dictionary) or "a transposition or inversion of idiomatic word order (as echoed the hills for the hills echoed)" (Merriam-Webster online dictionary). Some examples are given below:
 "Bloody thou art; bloody will be thy end" — William Shakespeare in Richard III, 4.4, 198.
 "Object there was none.  Passion there was none." — Edgar Allan Poe, The Tell-Tale Heart.
 "The helmsman steered, the ship moved on; / Yet never a breeze up blew" — Samuel Taylor Coleridge, The Rime of the Ancient Mariner
 "For while the tired waves, vainly breaking, / Seem here no painful inch to gain" — Arthur Hugh Clough, Say Not the Struggle Naught Availeth.
 "Arms and the man I sing" — Opening words of Virgil's Aeneid, translated by E. F. Taylor (1907).
 "Backward ran sentences until reeled the mind." — Wolcott Gibbs's 1936 parody of Time magazine.

See also
Anastrophe
Apposition
Figure of speech
Golden line
Parenthesis
Split infinitive

Bibliography
Aubrey, Mike. Discontinuous Syntax in the New Testament part 3.
Devine, Andrew M. & Laurence D. Stephens (1999), Discontinuous Syntax: Hyperbaton in Greek. Oxford University Press. Review by M.C. Beckwith.
Devine, Andrew M. & Laurence D. Stephens (2006), Latin Word Order. Structured Meaning and Information. Oxford: Oxford University Press. Pp. xii, 639. : Ch. 7 "Hyperbaton", pp. 524–610.
Nisbet, R. G. M. (1999). "The Word-Order of Horace's Odes". Proceedings of the British Academy, 93, 135-154.
Ntelitheos, Dimitrios (2004). Syntax of Elliptical and Discontinuous Nominals. University of California, Los Angeles, M.A. thesis.
Powell, J. G. (2010) "Hyperbaton and register in Cicero", in E. Dickey and A. Chahoud (eds.), Colloquial and Literary Latin, Cambridge: Cambridge University Press, 163–185.
Siewierska, A. (1984). "Phrasal Discontinuity in Polish", Australian Journal of Linguistics 4, 57–71.
Spevak, Olga (2010). Constituent Order in Classical Latin Prose''. Studies in Language Companion Series (SLCS) 117. Amsterdam/Philadelphia: John Benjamins Publishing Company, 2010.  Pp. xv, 318.  : pp. 23–26.

References

External links
Silva Rhetoricae entry

Rhetorical techniques
Word order
Obfuscation
Latin-language literature
New Testament
Greek literature (post-classical)